The Ranizai are a sub tribe of the Yusufzai Pashtun tribe in the Malakand District in North-West Frontier Province, Pakistan.
Ranizai tribe has occupied the upper part of district Malakand. The various important villages include Thana, Alladand Dheri, Batkhela, Khar, Dheri Julagram Totakan Mekhband Sholwai and Matkani. Alladand Dheri village was the head office. The various sub-tribes of Ranizai is Ali-khail. Ranizai is further divided into 5 sub-khels which are;
Mardan khel
Ismail khel
Umbarak khel
Dadi khel
kari khel 

Malakand District
Yusufzai Pashtun tribes